Posizolid is an oxazolidinone antibiotic under investigation by AstraZeneca for the treatment of bacterial infections.  At a concentration of 2 mg/L it inhibited 98% of all Gram-positive bacteria tested in vitro.

References 

Oxazolidinone antibiotics
Isoxazoles
Ethers
Fluoroarenes
Tetrahydropyridines
Carboxamides
Vicinal diols